Hossein Ojaghi (born 30 August 1975 in Tehran) is a former competitive wushu athlete and sanshou fighter from Iran. He has had an impressive run as a competitive wushu athlete from the late 1990s to the late 2000s and won medals in the Asian Games and the 2008 Beijing Wushu Tournament.

Achievements

 1997 World Wushu Championships 
 1998 Asian Games 
 1999 World Wushu Championships 
 2000 Asian Wushu Championships 
 2001 World Wushu Championships 
 2002 Sanshou World Cup 
 2002 Asian Games 
 2003 World Wushu Championships 
 2004 Asian Wushu Championships 
 2007 World Wushu Championships 
 2008 Asian Wushu Championships 
 2008 Wushu Tournament Beijing 
 2008 Sanshou World Cup 
 2009 World Wushu Championships

References

 Biography

1975 births
Living people
Iranian wushu practitioners
Iranian sanshou practitioners
Iranian male mixed martial artists
Mixed martial artists utilizing sanshou
Asian Games gold medalists for Iran
Asian Games silver medalists for Iran
Asian Games medalists in wushu
Wushu practitioners at the 2002 Asian Games
Wushu practitioners at the 1998 Asian Games
Medalists at the 1998 Asian Games
Medalists at the 2002 Asian Games
Competitors at the 2008 Beijing Wushu Tournament
20th-century Iranian people
21st-century Iranian people